Tapatan with Jay Sonza: Bayan, Ikaw ang Humatol is a Philippine television public affairs debate show broadcast by GMA Network. Hosted by Jay Sonza, it premiered on May 17, 1995. The show concluded on November 11, 1998. It was replaced by Debate with Mare at Pare in its timeslot.

The show later moved to Radio Philippines Network (RPN) in 2000. In 2004, the show moved once again to UNTV. The show had a radio edition that had been to four radio stations in AM band. From DZBB, it moved to DZRH and later DZXL and DZIQ. The show had radio spin-offs, Tapatan with Jay and Deo and Tapatan in DZIQ.

References

1995 Philippine television series debuts
2005 Philippine television series endings
Debate television series
Filipino-language television shows
GMA Network original programming
GMA Integrated News and Public Affairs shows
Philippine Daily Inquirer
Philippine television shows
Radio Philippines Network original programming
RPN News and Public Affairs shows
UNTV (Philippines) original programming